David Main may refer to: 

David Forsyth Main (1831–1880), New Zealand politician 
David Duncan Main (1856–1934), British doctor and missionary